Tassilo Thierbach (born 21 May 1956) is a German former pair skater. With partner Sabine Baeß, he is the 1982 World champion and a two-time European champion (1982, 1983).

Life and career 
Baeß/Thierbach were coached by Irene Salzmann in Karl-Marx-Stadt (today Chemnitz) and represented the club SC Karl-Marx-Stadt. They were the only figure skating pair representing East Germany to win the World or European championships.

Altogether, Thierbach skated with five partners: Romy Kermer (silver medallist at the Olympic Games with Rolf Österreich in 1976); Antje Heck; Petra Ronge; Sylvia Walter; and finally Sabine Baeß. In 1980 he suffered a meniscus injury to his knee, for which surgery was necessary. For this reason Baeß and Thierbach had to miss the Nationals and the Europeans in 1981. From 1977 to 1989, he was a Stasi informer under the codename "Gehrhard".

Thierbach runs the company Automaten Großaufstellung Tassilo Thierbach GmbH in Chemnitz. He has also worked as figure skating coach in collaboration with Ingo Steuer in Chemnitz.

Results

With Baeß

With Heck 
 1973 East German Championships: Bronze medalist with Antje Heck

References

 Sportecho, various issues 1984
 ISU statistics
 personal interview

Navigation 

1956 births
Living people
Sportspeople from Chemnitz
German male pair skaters
Figure skaters at the 1980 Winter Olympics
Figure skaters at the 1984 Winter Olympics
Olympic figure skaters of East Germany
World Figure Skating Championships medalists
European Figure Skating Championships medalists
People of the Stasi